Abhijit Mahalanobis is an electrical engineer at Lockheed Martin Missiles and Fire Control in Orlando, Florida. He was named a Fellow of the Institute of Electrical and Electronics Engineers (IEEE) in 2015 for his contributions to the development of correlation filters for automatic target recognition.

References 

Fellow Members of the IEEE
Living people
Year of birth missing (living people)
Place of birth missing (living people)
American electrical engineers